M. Georges Valensi (1889–1980) was a French telecommunications engineer who, in 1938, invented and patented a method of transmitting color images via luma and chrominance so that they could be received on both color and black & white television sets. Rival color television methods, which had been in development since the 1920s, were incompatible with monochrome televisions.

Valensi was an official of CCIF serving first as Secretary-General (1923–1948) and then as Director (1949–1956).

All current widely deployed color television standards – NTSC, SECAM, PAL and today's digital standards – implement his idea of transmitting a signal composed of separate luminance and chrominance. Because his invention pre-dated the actual introduction of color television by so long, his patent was exceptionally extended to 1971.

References

French telecommunications engineers
20th-century French inventors
Television pioneers
1889 births
1980 deaths